This is a list of 223 species in the genus Auletobius.

Auletobius species

References

Auletobius